Cinta (Love) is a 1975 Indonesian drama film directed and written by Wim Umboh. It stars Marini, Kusno Sudjarwadi, Ratno Timoer, Wahab Abdi and Komalasari.

References

1975 films
Indonesian drama films
1975 drama films
Films directed by Wim Umboh